George Booth (born 1767) was an English professional cricketer who made eight appearances in first-class cricket matches from 1796 to 1804.

He was mainly associated with Middlesex.

References

1767 births
English cricketers
English cricketers of 1787 to 1825
Middlesex cricketers
Year of death unknown
T. Mellish's XI cricketers
Non-international England cricketers